The People's Story Museum is a museum housed in the historic Canongate Tolbooth, which houses collections telling the story of the working-class people of Edinburgh from the late 18th century to the present day. This is done through use of oral history, reminiscence and written sources.

Collections 

The museum houses Britain's largest collection of early reform flags and banners: 144 in all. These include banners in support of political reform, trade unions and the anti-apartheid movement. The museums also houses waxworks and which illustrate the written histories of Edinburgh people.

Galleries 

There are three galleries and a film screening room in the museum. The first gallery looks at life in tenement houses in the 18th century. The second gallery houses many banners from the museum's collection and tells the stories of Edinburgh citizens in the 20th century, through waxworks and written histories. The final galleries describe Edinburgh in the mid- to late-20th century.

The film in the screening room shows personal stories of four Edinburgh citizens who grew up in the city and worked in the printing and building trades, in a co-op store and as a servant.

References

External links 

 

Museums in Edinburgh